The Westerner is a 1940 American Western film directed by William Wyler and starring Gary Cooper, Walter Brennan and Doris Davenport. Written by Niven Busch, Stuart N. Lake and Jo Swerling, the film concerns a self-appointed hanging judge in Vinegaroon, Texas, who befriends a saddle tramp who opposes the judge's policy against homesteaders. The film is remembered for Walter Brennan's performance as Judge Roy Bean, for which he won his record-setting third Academy Award for Best Supporting Actor. James Basevi and Stuart N. Lake also received Academy Award nominations for Best Art Direction, Black and White and Best Story, respectively. The supporting cast features Dana Andrews, Chill Wills and Forrest Tucker.

Plot
In 1882, the town of Vinegaroon, Texas is run by Judge Roy Bean, who calls himself "the only law west of the Pecos." Conducting trials from his saloon, Bean makes a corrupt living collecting fines and seizing property unlawfully. Those who stand up to him are usually hanged, receiving what Bean calls "suspended sentences."

Cole Harden is a drifter accused of stealing a horse belonging to Chickenfoot, Bean's main sidekick. Harden's conviction by a jury composed of Bean's acolytes seems certain, and the undertaker waits eagerly for the verdict and hanging. Bean dismisses Harden's contention that he had bought the horse legally from another man. Noticing the judge's obsession with the English actress Lily Langtry, Harden claims to have known her intimately. He cons the judge into delaying the death sentence until Harden can send for a lock of the Langtry's hair, which he claims to have in El Paso. The delay is long enough for the real horse thief to appear and be killed.

Despite his warped sense of justice and his corrupt nature, Bean likes Harden, considering him a kindred spirit because Harden is as bold and daring as Bean was in his youth. However, Bean tries to shoot him when Harden lends his support to the homesteaders, a group led by Jane-Ellen Mathews and her father Caliphet. The struggling homesteaders have been at odds with Bean and his cattle-rancher allies for a long time. Harden tries to appeal to the judge's better nature, and he even saves Bean from an attempted lynching. When that fails, and a corn crop is burned and Mr. Mathews killed, Harden sees no choice but to take action. He is deputized by the county sheriff and procures an arrest warrant for Bean.

Arresting Bean in Vinegaroon, now renamed Langtry by the judge in honor of the actress, is impossible with all of Bean's men around. When Bean learns that Langtry will be appearing in a nearby town, a long day's ride from Vinegaroon, he has one of his men buy all of the tickets. Bean dons his full Confederate Civil War regalia and rides to see the performance with his men. He enters the theater alone to await the performance, leaving his henchmen outside.

Unknown to Bean, Harden has been waiting in the theater to arrest him. A standoff and shootout occur and Bean is fatally wounded during the gunfight. Harden carries Bean backstage to meet the woman whom he has adored for so long. As Bean stares at her, he dies.

Two years later, Harden and Jane, now married and having rebuilt the burned farm, watch as new settlers arrive in the territory.

Cast
 Gary Cooper as Cole Harden
 Walter Brennan as Judge Roy Bean
 Doris Davenport as Jane Ellen Mathews
 Fred Stone as Caliphet Mathews
 Forrest Tucker as Wade Harper
 Paul Hurst as Chickenfoot
 Chill Wills as Southeast
 Lilian Bond as Lillie Langtry
 Dana Andrews as Hod Johnson
 Charles Halton as Mort Borrow
 Trevor Bardette as Shad Wilkins
 Tom Tyler as King Evans
 Lucien Littlefield as The Stranger
 Hank Bell as Deputy (uncredited) 
 Charles Coleman as Lily Langtry's Manager (uncredited)
 Heinie Conklin as Man at Ticket Window (uncredited)

Production
When Gary Cooper learned that Walter Brennan would be playing the part of Judge Roy Bean, he tried to withdraw from the film, believing that his character would be reduced to a minor role. Although Goldwyn assured Cooper that his role would be expanded, Cooper remained unconvinced, writing to Samuel Goldwyn: "I couldn't see that it needed Gary Cooper for the part." Goldwyn remained adamant about Cooper's contractual obligations and insisted that he star in the film. In a formal letter to Goldwyn indicating his intention to sever their future working relationship, Cooper agreed to fulfill his contract and to "perform my services...to the fullest of my ability, with the express understanding that I am doing so under protest."

Cooper and Brennan appeared in eight films together: Watch Your Wife (1926), The Wedding Night (1935), The Cowboy and the Lady (1938), The Westerner (1940), Meet John Doe (1941), Sergeant York (1941), Pride of the Yankees (1942) and Task Force (1949).

Accolades
The Westerner was nominated by the American Film Institute for inclusion in the Western category of its 2008 list AFI's 10 Top 10.

References

External links

 
 
 
 
 The Westerner on Lux Radio Theater: September 23, 1940

1940 Western (genre) films
1940 films
American Western (genre) films
American black-and-white films
Cultural depictions of Roy Bean
1940s English-language films
Films about capital punishment
Films directed by William Wyler
Films featuring a Best Supporting Actor Academy Award-winning performance
Films scored by Alfred Newman
Films scored by Dimitri Tiomkin
Films set in Texas
Films with screenplays by Jo Swerling
Samuel Goldwyn Productions films
United Artists films
1940s American films